Guillermo Echevarría Pérez (13 May 1948 – 24 November 2021) was a Mexican swimmer who competed at the 1964 Summer Olympics and the 1968 Summer Olympics.  

Echevarría was born on 13 May 1948 in Mexico City. He briefly held the world record in the 1500 meter (long course), breaking Mike Burton's record in 1968, before Burton took the record back two months later. 

Echevarría died on 24 November 2021, at the age of 73.

See also
 World record progression 1500 metres freestyle

References

1948 births
2021 deaths
Mexican male swimmers
Swimmers from Mexico City
Mexican male freestyle swimmers
Male backstroke swimmers
Olympic swimmers of Mexico
Swimmers at the 1964 Summer Olympics
Swimmers at the 1968 Summer Olympics
Competitors at the 1966 Central American and Caribbean Games
Central American and Caribbean Games gold medalists for Mexico
Central American and Caribbean Games medalists in swimming
20th-century Mexican people